Luís Henrique Dias (born 18 May 1960) is a Brazilian former footballer who played as a goalkeeper. He competed in the 1984 Summer Olympics with the Brazil national football team.

References

1960 births
Place of birth missing (living people)
Living people
Association football goalkeepers
Brazilian footballers
Olympic footballers of Brazil
Footballers at the 1984 Summer Olympics
Olympic silver medalists for Brazil
Olympic medalists in football
Botafogo Futebol Clube (SP) players
Associação Atlética Ponte Preta players
Criciúma Esporte Clube players
São José Esporte Clube players
Coritiba Foot Ball Club players
Rio Branco Esporte Clube players
Paraná Clube players
Clube Atlético Mineiro players
União São João Esporte Clube players
Esporte Clube Santo André players
Medalists at the 1984 Summer Olympics
Pan American Games medalists in football
Pan American Games gold medalists for Brazil
Footballers at the 1979 Pan American Games
Medalists at the 1979 Pan American Games
20th-century Brazilian people